Narrative Inquiry is a biannual peer-reviewed academic journal published by John Benjamins Publishing Company covering work on narrative. It was established in 1991 by Lawrence Erlbaum Associates as the  Journal of Narrative and Life History and obtained its current title in 1998 when it moved to its present publisher. The editors-in-chief are Dorien Van De Mieroop (KU Leuven) and Allyssa McCabe (University of Massachusetts Lowell).

Abstracting and indexing
The journal is abstracted and indexed in:

Reception
The journal's most cited papers,  include:

According to the Journal Citation Reports, the journal has a 2020 impact factor of 0.583.

References

External links

John Benjamins academic journals
Publications established in 1991
English-language journals
Biannual journals
Linguistics journals